The Allergy & Asthma Network (“The Network”), formerly known as Allergy & Asthma Network/ Mothers of Asthmatics (AANMA), is a nonprofit organization in the United States. The Allergy & Asthma Network unites and advocates on behalf of the 60 million Americans with allergies, asthma and related conditions. The Network is tax-exempt, falling under section 501(3)(c) of the United States Internal Revenue Code.

The organization was founded in 1985, by Nancy Sander, the mother of a child with severe asthma. Since 2014, the Network has been led by Tonya Winders, MBA, who serves as its president and CEO.

The Network has four mission areas:  education, outreach, advocacy and research.

Outreach initiatives include local community outreach through programs including Not One More Life Trusted Messengers, which offers free lung screenings and asthma coaching in underserved communities for people with asthma and COPD.

Education initiatives are focused on consumers and health care professionals. The resources are medically reviewed for accuracy. Educational programs include monthly webinars with national experts and digital events such as the annual USAsthma Summit.  The organization also offers digital resources on the Allergy & Asthma Network website. Continuing education is also offered to healthcare professionals.

Advocacy initiatives empower stakeholders to impact public policy and get involved in advocating for asthma and allergy issues with their elected officials. Each year, the Network hosts Allergy & Asthma Day on Capitol Hill, where patients and healthcare professionals come together to visit their legislators and make their voices heard.

Research initiatives include funding studies that represent patient perspectives and needs.  Other work includes qualitative market research, focus groups and engaging people with patient centered outcomes research. The Network also connects people with available clinical trials in allergy, asthma and related diseases.

Allergy & Asthma Network has been the recipient of two recent Patient Centered Outcomes Research (PCORI) engagement awards, Black People Like Me and Unidos Hablemos (Let’s Talk about…). Each of these engagement awards offered a series of six online conferences to better understand the needs of the Black and Hispanic/Latino communities regarding asthma during the COVID-19 pandemic. The conferences also were held to find out what questions Black and Hispanic/Latino patients and caregivers want answered through engaging in patient-centered outcomes research.

References

Labor Of Love  
About AANMA  
Take the Bite Out Insect Stings

External links
 Allergy & Asthma Network (AAN)

Charities based in Virginia
Health charities in the United States
Asthma organizations
Medical and health organizations based in Virginia